The Doodler is an unidentified serial killer believed responsible for up to 16 murders and three assaults of men in San Francisco, California, between January 1974 and September 1975. The nickname was given due to the perpetrator's habit of sketching his victims prior to their sexual encounters and slayings by stabbing. The perpetrator met his victims at gay nightclubs, bars and restaurants.

Murders

It is believed that the Doodler killed between six and sixteen people. Several victims were stabbed in the front and back of their bodies in similar locations. All of the victims were white males. Police theorized that the victims had all died after meeting with the suspect near the locations where their bodies were recovered.

The suspect was described as a black man between 19 and 25 years of age. He was about six feet tall with a slender build. In the early stages of the investigation police believed there could have been as many as three different perpetrators.

Gerald Cavanagh
Gerald Earl Cavanagh, a Canadian-American immigrant, is believed to be the Doodler's first victim. He was 49 at the time of his slaying, which had occurred by stabbing. Cavanagh's fully clothed body was located on January 24, 1974, lying face-up on Ocean Beach in San Francisco, California, in the early hours of the morning. He had died hours before. He was determined to have been conscious at the time he was killed and had attempted to resist his killer because he had self-defense wounds. He initially remained unidentified, being temporarily known as "John Doe #7" by the medical examiner. He was a single man and few details are available about his personal life.

Joseph "Jae" Stevens
Joseph Stevens, best known by the nickname "Jae", was discovered on June 25, 1974, by a woman walking along Spreckels Lake in San Francisco. Stevens was 27 and had died shortly before his body was found; he had been seen at a club the previous day. He was employed as a "female impersonator" and comedian. Officers suspected that Stevens was alive at the time he had been at Spreckels Lake, possibly transporting himself to the area with the killer.

Klaus Christmann
Klaus Christmann, a German-American immigrant, was discovered by a woman walking her dog on July 7, 1974. He was found similarly to Gerald Cavanaugh, at Ocean Beach in San Francisco. His death had been somewhat more violent than the previous murders because he had considerably more stab wounds than Stevens and had been slashed in the throat several times. The body was fully clothed. Christmann, unlike the previous victims, was married and had children. The fact that he had a "make-up tube" on his person when he died suggested to police he may have been a closeted gay man.

He remained unidentified briefly while police were investigating the cases, which they had believed were related after the third murder. He was buried in his native country, Germany.

Warren Andrews
In January 2022, the San Francisco Police identified a sixth victim of the Doodler. Warren Andrews, a lawyer for the 
U.S. Postal Service, was murdered in Land's End in April 1975. He was 52 years old.

Frederick Capin
Frederick Elmer Capin, aged 32, was discovered on May 12, 1975, in San Francisco. He had been stabbed like the other victims, dying from strikes to his aorta. It is believed his body had been moved approximately 20 feet as disturbances in the nearby sand indicated. Capin was identified through fingerprints when these were matched to those taken "by the state" due to his occupation as a nurse. He also had served in the United States Navy, earning medals while serving in the Vietnam War.

Harald Gullberg
Harald Gullberg, aged 66, was a Swedish-American immigrant who was discovered on June 4, 1975 in a decomposed state about two weeks after his death in Lincoln Park. He remains slightly inconsistent with the other homicides because he was far older than the others, his underwear had been taken by his killer and his pants were unzipped. Gullberg is believed to be the final victim of the Doodler. While he remained unidentified, he was known as "John Doe #81".

Table of victims

Investigation

Police questioned a young man as a murder suspect in the case, but could not proceed with criminal charges because the three surviving victims did not want to "out" themselves by testifying against him in court. Among the stabbing survivors were a "well-known entertainer" and a diplomat. The suspect cooperated with police during his interview but he never admitted guilt for the murders and attacks. Officers stated that they strongly believed that the man in question was responsible for the crimes, but he was never tried or convicted because of the survivors' refusals to appear in court. To date, the suspect has not been named publicly or apprehended; very little information is available to the public about the crimes.

Two other potential suspects arose in 1977 after a pair of men from Redondo Beach were arrested in Riverside County, California, and questioned on suspicion of approximately 28 murders that, like the San Francisco killings, occurred after "homosexual encounters".

Status
As of May 2018, the case is open and ongoing in the San Francisco Police Department. Recent successes using DNA technology developed in the decades since the crimes have led police to re-examine evidence in the case.

In February 2019, police offered a $100,000 reward for information leading to the arrest of the killer and released a revised sketch showing what he could look like four decades later. They later announced they would consider forensic genetic genealogy, which identified a suspect in the Golden State Killer murders.

Aftermath
At the time, activist Harvey Milk publicly expressed empathy for the victims who refused to speak with police, stating, "I understand their position. I respect the pressure society has put on them." Milk elaborated that the three men likely feared damaging relationships with family and in the workforce, citing that he believed "20% to 25%" of the 85,000 gay men in San Francisco were closeted about their sexualities.

See also 
 List of fugitives from justice who disappeared
 List of serial killers in the United States
 List of serial killers by number of victims

References

External links
The Untold Story of the Doodler Murders, The Awl, published on December 11, 2014.

1940s births
1950s births
1974 in California
1974 murders in the United States
1975 in California
1975 murders in the United States
20th-century LGBT people
American serial killers
Criminals of the San Francisco Bay Area
LGBT people from California
Possibly living people
Unidentified serial killers
Unsolved murders in the United States
Violence against gay men in the United States
Violence against men in North America